was a Japanese samurai of the late Edo period, who became a Christian during the Meiji period. He was born in Aizu, and fought in the Boshin War. In his adult life, he also became an ordained minister, and was an educator.

References 

  "Ibuka Kajinosuke" in Aizu jinbutsuden (29 Feb. 2008)
 Hoshi, Ryōichi (2006). Onnatachi no Aizusensō. Tokyo: Shin Jinbutsu Ōraisha.

Samurai
People from Aizu
1854 births
1935 deaths
Japanese Protestants
People of the Boshin War
Japanese educators